Aquimarina mytili  is a Gram-negative, strictly aerobic, rod-shaped bacterium from the genus of Aquimarina which has been isolated from the gut microflora of the mussel Mytilus coruscus which was collected from the Gwangyang Bay in Korea.

References

External links
Type strain of Aquimarina mytili at BacDive -  the Bacterial Diversity Metadatabase

Flavobacteria
Bacteria described in 2012